Ellet Joseph "E.J." Waggoner (January 12, 1855 – May 28, 1916) was a Seventh-day Adventist particularly known for his impact on the theology of the church, along with friend and associate Alonzo T. Jones at the 1888 Minneapolis General Conference Session. At the meeting of the General Conference of Seventh-day Adventists  Ellet J. Waggoner along with Alonzo T. Jones presented a message on justification supported by Ellen G. White, but resisted by church leaders such as G. I. Butler and others. He supported theological issues such as the meaning of "righteousness by faith", the nature of the Godhead, the relationship between law and grace, and Justification and its relationship to Sanctification.

Biography 

Waggoner was born in Baraboo, Wisconsin on January 12, 1855, to Joseph Harvey and Maryetta Hall Waggoner.  He was the sixth of ten children.

His father had joined an Advent group in 1852, which would later become the Seventh-day Adventist Church. Soon thereafter he became a preacher and writer, and remained active until his death in 1889. He was on the committee that adopted the official name – Seventh-day Adventist – that is still in use today.

Ellet Waggoner attended Battle Creek College (now Andrews University) and later graduated as a physician from Bellevue Medical College in New York City.  For some time he served on the staff of the Battle Creek Sanitarium. During this time, he married Jessie Moser, whom he had met at Battle Creek College. Jessie and Waggoner had two daughters, Bessie and Pearl. They moved to California about 1880, where he served as manager of the St. Helena Hospital in Saint Helena, California.

In 1883, Waggoner stopped practicing medicine and became the assistant editor for the Signs of the Times – an official paper presenting the stands and views of the Seventh-day Adventist Church. His father, J. H. Waggoner was then the editor.

He met Alonzo T. Jones in 1884. In 1886 Ellet Waggoner and his friend Jones became joint editors of the Signs of the Times. Waggoner held this post until 1891. The magazine published a number of his articles in the five years preceding the notable 1888 Minneapolis General Conference.  In 1888 Waggoner presented his ideas regarding righteousness by faith at the General Conference session held in Minneapolis, Minnesota. The events surrounding and topics presented at that session continue to be debated and studied.

In 1892 Waggoner went to England where he became the editor of The Present Truth magazine. He remained there for ten years, working with W. W. Prescott in the training school in England, and continuing in his writing and studies on Christ and His righteousness.

Upon his return to the United States, he joined the faculty of Emmanuel Missionary College (now Andrews University). Because of a divorce and his subsequent remarriage, he separated from denominational employment. He spent the last years of his life employed by the Battle Creek Sanitarium.

Waggoner experienced a stroke in his sleep and died at home in Battle Creek on Friday, May 28, 1916.

Publications 
Some of his better known writings include
The Glad Tidings (1900 Original)
The Everlasting Covenant (1896)
The Gospel in Creation (1895)
The Gospel in Galatians (1887)
Waggoner on Romans (1896)
Sermons on Romans (1891)
Christ and His Righteousness (1889)
The Fathers of the Catholic Church
Also:
Prophetic Lights (DjVu format)

See also 

 Alonzo T. Jones
 1888 Minneapolis General Conference
 History of the Seventh-day Adventist Church
 Seventh-day Adventist Church
 Seventh-day Adventist theology
 Seventh-day Adventist eschatology
 Teachings of Ellen White
 Inspiration of Ellen White
 Prophecy in the Seventh-day Adventist Church
 Investigative judgment
 The Pillars of Adventism
 Second Advent
 Baptism by Immersion
 Conditional Immortality
 Historicism
 Three Angels' Messages
 End times
 Sabbath in Seventh-day Adventism
 Ellen G. White
 Adventist Review
 Adventist
 Seventh-day Adventist Church Pioneers
 Seventh-day Adventist worship

References and external links 

 Richard Lewis, ed. The Living Witness (Mountain View, Calf.: Pacific Press, 1959).
 David P. McMahon. Ellet Joseph Waggoner: The Myth and the Man (SDA.net version) (Fallbrook, Calif.: Verdict Publications, 1979).
 R. W. Schwartz. Light Bearers to the Remnant (Boise, Idaho: Pacific Press, 1979).
 A. W. Spalding. Captains of the Host. (Washington, DC: Review and Herald, 1949).
 Clinton Wahlen, "What Did E. J. Waggoner Say at Minneapolis?" Adventist Heritage 13:1 (Winter 1988): 22–37
 "The Christology of Ellet Joseph Waggoner", chapter 3 in  Reprinted with permission by Andrews University Press. Berrien Springs, MI (February 1992)
 Woodrow W. Whidden II. E. J. Waggoner: From the Physician of Good News to Agent of Division (Hagerstown, MD: Review and Herald, 2008)

Seventh-day Adventist religious workers
Seventh-day Adventist theologians
American theologians
1855 births
1916 deaths
American Seventh-day Adventists
People from Baraboo, Wisconsin
Andrews University alumni